Jeetendra Ghadge is an Indian activist based in Girgaon, Mumbai. Instrumental in exposing a police-politician nexus and working towards implementing police reforms. A full-time whistleblower Ghadge has also uncovered poor performance in controlling corruption by Anti-Corruption Bureau, Mumbai. As a RTI activist his work on uncovering alleged corruption in dam construction has led, according to the Times of India, to harassment of Ghadge.

Born in Pune district Jeetendra Ghadge was brought up in Mumbai city by his mother Usha Ghadge and father Vasant Ghadge. Ghadge also exposed the plight of farmers in Maharashtra's villages, nearly half of the farmers in Maharashtra who have committed suicide over the last four years were denied a paltry Rs 1 lakh compensation. Taking notice of this news publish all over India National Human Rights Commission took suo-moto cognizance and issued a notice to the Maharashtra Government. In effort to control the crises Maharashtra Government announced framing of new rules and increased the compensation to 5 lakhs rupees.

References

External links 
 The Young Whistleblowers
 
 jeetghadge.blogspot.in
 Govt withdrew nearly 2000 cases in 6 years: RTI
 Maharashtra yet to implement 2013 Lokayukta Act: RTI
 Police Complaint Authority Formation in Maharashtra Delayed: RTI Reply
 Maha farmer suicide count already higher than 2014
 Probe ordered in only 9% graft plaints in nearly 4 yrs
 Police complaint authority formation in Maha delayed:RTI reply
 ACB hasn’t filed charge sheets in 95 cases, RTI query reveals
 Maharashtra lost 530 sq km green cover to government, private projects in 28 years
 In 6 years, Mumbai fire brigade files just 14 cases against housing societies
 7,700 complaints lodged with ACB in 3 years, but only 7 FIRs
 BMC FAILED TO ACT AGAINST CORRUPT OFFICIALS: RTI
 ACB hasn’t filed charge sheets in 95 cases, RTI query reveals
 Mumbai: BMC spent Rs 97 lakh on municipal commissioner's bungalow in 5 years
 Maharashtra let go 5 tmc water to Gujarat: RTI
 NO ACTION ON 1,863 PLAINTS BY MAHA LOKAYUKTA
 Maharashtra's green cover is thinning. Planting 2 crore trees isn't enough

Indian whistleblowers
Freedom of information activists
Indian anti-corruption activists
People from Mumbai
Marathi people
Indian investigative journalists
Living people
Year of birth missing (living people)